The 1964 Barking Council election took place on 7 May 1964 to elect members of Barking London Borough Council in London, England. The whole council was up for election and the Labour Party gained control of the council.

Background
These elections were the first to the newly formed borough. Previously elections had taken place in the Municipal Borough of Barking and Municipal Borough of Dagenham. These boroughs were joined to form the new London Borough of Barking by the London Government Act 1963.

A total of 130 candidates stood in the election for the 49 seats being contested across 12 wards. These included a full slate from the Labour party, while the Conservative and Liberal parties stood 41 and 25 respectively. Other candidates included 10 from the Communist Party, 4 Residents and 1 Independent Liberal. There were 11 four-seat wards and 1 five-seat ward.

This election had aldermen as well as directly elected councillors. Labour got all 8 aldermen. 

The Council was elected in 1964 as a "shadow authority" but did not start operations until 1 April 1965.

Results
The results saw Labour gain the new council with a majority of 41 after winning 45 of the 49 seats. Overall turnout in the election was 29.1%. This turnout included 228 postal votes.

Results by ward

Abbey

Cambell

Chadwell Heath

Eastbrook

Fanshaw

Gascoigne

Heath

Longbridge

Manor

River

Valence

Village

By-elections between 1964 and 1968
There were no by-elections.

References

1964
1964 London Borough council elections